Hassanabad is a Shia dominated area of Srinagar district, Kashmir, India. It is located on the western banks of the Dal Lake. The population is approximately 4000. 

It has one of the oldest Shia mosques of Srinagar. Hassanabad was founded by Baba Hassan.

Srinagar district